USS Relief may refer to the following ships of the United States Navy:

, a store ship launched in 1836 and sold in 1883
, a hospital ship commissioned in 1909 and sold in 1919
, purchased in 1917 and used as a lookout station tender in Maine; sold in 1921
, a salvage tug, in commission from 1918 to 1919
, a lightship built in 1904 and out of service in the 1920s
, a hospital ship commissioned in 1920 and decommissioned in 1946

See also
 , a former United States Coast Guard lightship launched in 1950 and out of service in 1976, now a museum ship

United States Navy ship names